Camilla "Milly" Rosso and Rebecca "Becky" Rosso (born 6 July 1994) are British identical twin former actresses and singers from London. They are best known for their roles as Janice (Milly) and Jessica (Becky) Ellis on The Suite Life of Zack & Cody, and for their roles as Annabelle "Annie" (Milly) and Isabelle "Izzy" (Becky) Woods in Legally Blondes (2009).

Early life
Milly is a minute younger than Becky. They are half British on their mother's side and half Latin American on their father's side. They have lived in Latin American countries such as Colombia, Argentina, and Venezuela.

Careers
Milly and Becky were discovered when they were picked out of the audience by one of the executive producers of The Suite Life of Zack & Cody at a live taping of the show. They appeared in a total seven episodes of the show and then appeared in one episode of the spin-off The Suite Life on Deck in March 2010.

The twins starred as the main roles in the film Legally Blondes, which was released direct-to-DVD on 28 April 2009 as a sequel to Legally Blonde. They sang "Lucky Girl" for the film. Legally Blondes was produced by Reese Witherspoon, the star of the original Legally Blonde. They starred in a pilot episode for Suburban Legends which was not picked up as a series ultimately. They soon retired from the acting industry.

Milly and Becky were part of an all-girl group called The Rosso Sisters, along with their sisters, Georgina and Lola. Their eldest sister, Bianca Rosso did not join the group. They were signed by Virgin Records on the spot by Steve Barnett and were managed by Paul Kevin Jonas Sr., the father of the Jonas Brothers. In 2015, they announced on their Facebook and Instagram accounts the disbandment of their group due to the death of their mother. They haven't performed since.

Filmography

References

External links
 
 

1994 births
British actresses
British child actresses
British expatriates in the United States
British identical twins
British television actresses
Living people
Identical twin females